The Spooks of Bottle Bay is a children's drama series shown between the years of 1993 and 1995 on CITV. The stories behind the show were created by Ian Allen of Button Moon fame, and the puppets and sets were designed by John Thirtle. Three videos containing a few episodes from the first two series were released in the 1990s, but nothing has been released since 2004 in USA and the show has never been repeated on television. The series was directed by Paul Cole.

Plot 
The Spooks of Bottle Bay followed the adventures of nice-guy Sidney Sludge and his dog Maxwell, and the town folk of Bottle Bay. The town was in fact located in a bottle on a mantelpiece of an unknown person's house. The residents are forever plagued by Sidney's evil siblings, Sybil and Cedric. Sidney spent most of the time trying to avoid the problems caused by his brother and sister and was always helped, albeit unwittingly, by the Spooks of Bottle Bay.

Characters 
Sidney Malcolm Sludge - Played by Nigel Plaskitt - The lead character of the series. A good-natured, friendly and honest, if sometimes slow-witted, young man, his adventures include looking for jobs around Bottle Bay, and even finding love on one occasion. He spends much of his time avoiding the crimes of his evil brother and sister, Sybil and Cedric. He technically also owns part of the estate agents his siblings run as his father left it to them all but this is never acknowledged by his sibling except for the pilot. He lived in a beach hut in the first series but by series two was staying at the Seaview Guest House, to try and avoid his siblings. Sid delivers his catch-phrase "Now that's spooky!" at the end of each episode in Series Two and Three.

Sybil Melanie Sludge - Played by Francis Wright and Simon Buckley - The green skinned, flame haired sister of Sidney. She is, along with Cedric, the main antagonist of the show. Sybil spends her time plotting thefts, and also trying to defeat the Spooks in the later episodes. The Spooks, however, always managed to outwit her, no matter how clever her plans were.

Cedric Montague Sludge - Played by John Thirtle and Richard Coombs - The brother of Sybil and Sid, Cedric tended to help his sister with her schemes, rather than coming up with his own. He does, however, match his sister in ruthlessness - he will do anything to get rich.

Maxwell - Maxi is a blue bulldog and is Sidney's loyal companion. Cedric sometimes fought Sidney for ownership of Maxwell.

Sally Spook - Played by Louise Gold and Heather Tobias -She is, along with Fred Spook, the leader of the Spooks of Bottle Bay and mother to Baby Spook.

Fred Spook - Played by John Thirtle - One of the leaders of the gang of ghosts that are out to foil the evil plots of Cybil and Cedric.

Baby Spook - Played by Ian Allen and Simon Buckley -Baby Spook is a Ghost who lives with Fred and Sally in the House on the Hill.

Betty Bat - Is a bat who lives in the House on the Hill with Fred, Sally and Baby Spook.

Tommy - Tommy is a Spook who wears a red hat, and always has a smile on his face. He lives at the Sea View Guest House and sometimes secretly helps out Sidney Sludge when he is a victim of his siblings' misdeeds. Despite his rather creepy, devilish appearance and love of mischief, he is far from being evil and always helps to thwart Sybil and Cedric.

Ted and Lily Turine - Played by Phil Eason and Steve Nallon Ted and Lily own the Seaview Guest House, where Sid stays.

Iris - Lily's identical twin sister who visits Seaview Guest House in one episode.

Madge - Played by Sue Dacre - The housekeeper at the Seaview Guest House.

Gran - An old woman who takes a shine to Sid. She owns a cat called Norman.

Joe - Played by Phil Eason - Seaman who takes care of the Mermaid Molly galleon moored in the harbour. Owns a parrot called 'Bananas'.

Duchess of Dingledale - Played by Steve Nallon. Royalty who visited prestigious events in Bottle Bay. She awarded prizes at the Bottle Bay Dog Show and the Talent Show on the pier, and also attended the party on the Galleon, where Sybil attempted to steal her diamonds.

Bella Butler - Played by Heather Tobias - Bella owns The Happy Plaice, the fish and chip shop in Bottle Bay.

Lucy Spook - Played by Heather Tobias - Lucy is Sally's best friend, who lives in the antique shop.

Nancy Spook - Played by Nigel Plaskitt - Nancy is an Irish spook who lives in the launderette, who often babysits for Baby Spook whilst Sally is at nightschool.

Daphy Played by Steve Nallon. Another Spook character. She is bright pink and wears a pair of green glasses and is very well-spoken. Daphy lives with Tommy at the Sea View Guest House, were Sidney lived with his dog Maxi.

Damask the Highwayman - Played by Nigel Plaskitt - The ghost of a Highwayman, whom Sally encounters in series one. He unwittingly foils Cedric's plan to steal millions of pounds from Sybil.

Brenda Drain - Played by Heather Tobias - Sid's girlfriend.

Other spooks include Bed Bug Willy Spook (Ian Allen) and the School Master (Nigel Plaskitt) spook who led the night school that many of the younger ghosts attended. Captain Patch, (Nigel Plaskitt) one of the many spooks who haunted the galleon moored in the harbour, was called upon by Sally and Fred in order to stop Sybil from stealing the Duchess of Dingledale's (Steve Nallon) diamonds.

Other residents of Bottle Bay have also appeared in various episodes, including the Punch and Judy man, Bill, who performs on the pier; the Bottle Bay hairdresser, whose salon was invaded by Sybil in an attempt to find out where Sidney was living; and PC Twopence, the Bottle Bay police officer.

Music
Spooky Musicals (2004-03-18)

Home Media
Spooks of Bottle Bay All Season 1 Episodes (2004-10-10)
Spooks of Bottle Bay All Season 2 Episodes (2004-10-10)
Spooks of Bottle Bay Eleven Season 3 Episodes (2004-10-10)

References

External links 

Spooks of Bottle Bay page at Little Gems

1993 British television series debuts
1995 British television series endings
1990s British children's television series
British children's fantasy television series
British supernatural television shows
ITV children's television shows
British television shows featuring puppetry
Carlton Television
Television series by ITV Studios
Television series produced at Pinewood Studios
English-language television shows
Television series about ghosts